Cruise Control may refer to:

Cruise control, a system that automatically controls the speed of a motor vehicle
CruiseControl, software build framework
Cruise Control (play), a 2014 play by David Williamson
"Cruise Control" (Headless Chickens song), a song by Headless Chickens from the 1991 album Body Blow 
"Cruise Control", a song by Mariah Carey from the 2008 album E=MC²
"Cruise Control", a song by Kylie Minogue from the 2003 album Body Language
"Cruise Control", a song by the Dixie Dregs from the 1977 album Free Fall
"Cruise Control", a song by Tower of Power from the 1993 album T.O.P.
Speed 2: Cruise Control, a 1997 film
Speed 2: Cruise Control (soundtrack)